Anthony or Tony Shaw may refer to:

Anthony Shaw (violinist) (1747–1792), English violinist
Anthony Shaw (British Army officer) (1930–2015), director general of the Army Medical Services
Tony Shaw (Australian rules footballer)
Tony Shaw (rugby union), Australian rugby union player
Antony Shaw, New Zealand barrister and law professor